Hilarographa mariannae is a species of moth of the family Tortricidae. It is found in Brazil.

The wingspan is about 14 mm. The ground colour of the forewings is orange with paler and darker lines. The hindwings are orange with a slight brownish admixture.

Etymology
This species is named for Dr. Marianne Horak in recognition of her outstanding work on the higher classification of Tortricidae.

References

Moths described in 2009
Hilarographini
Moths of South America
Taxa named by Józef Razowski